Auria Union is an Union parishad of Narail Sadar Upazila, Narail District in Khulna Division of Bangladesh. It has an area of 51.88 km2 (20.03 sq mi) and a population of 22,897.

References

Unions of Narail Sadar Upazila